Lepidochrysops parsimon, the western giant Cupid, is a butterfly in the family Lycaenidae. It is found in Guinea, Sierra Leone, southern Burkina Faso, Ivory Coast, Ghana, Togo, western Nigeria, Cameroon and the Central African Republic. The habitat consists of the forest/savanna transition zone.

References

Butterflies described in 1775
Lepidochrysops
Taxa named by Johan Christian Fabricius